Sonny Liew (born 26 September 1974) is a Malaysia-born comic artist/illustrator based in Singapore. He is best known for The Art of Charlie Chan Hock Chye (2015), the first graphic novel to win the Singapore Literature Prize for fiction.

Early life and education
Born in Seremban, Malaysia, Liew attended school at Victoria School and Victoria Junior College in Singapore. He went on to read philosophy at Clare College in Cambridge University in UK and studied illustration at the Rhode Island School of Design in 2001.

Career
His first foray into comic illustration was with Singaporean tabloid paper The New Paper in 1995, contributing a comic strip titled Frankie and Poo. A compilation of the strips was published by Times Publishing in 1996. Shortly after his graduation from Rhode Island Liew got his first break into the American comics industry when Shelly Bond signed him on for Vertigo Comics' My Faith in Frankie together with Mike Carey and Marc Hempel.

His work has appeared in the Flight Anthologies edited by Kazu Kibuishi, and he has served as editor of the Eisner-nominated Southeast Asian comics anthology Liquid City  from Image Comics. In 2011, he was nominated for an Eisner award in the pencilling/inking category for his work on SLG and Disney's Wonderland, written by Tommy Kovac.Other titles include  Marvel Comics' Sense and Sensibility adaptation, First Second Books' "The Shadow Hero" with Gene Luen Yang, An origin story for the obscure Golden-Age comic book hero The Green Turtle, who is thought to be the first Asian-American superhero  and DC Comics' "Doctor Fate" with Paul Levitz.

He is also the creator of Malinky Robot, a Xeric Award recipient in 2004 and winner of the “Prix de la Meilleure BD” (Comic Album of the Year) at the Utopiales International SF Festival in Nantes in 2009. He was a recipient of  Singapore's Young Artist Award in 2010.

The Art of Charlie Chan Hock Chye

The Art of Charlie Chan Hock Chye was first published and released by Epigram Books in 2015. It charts the life and career of a fictional comic book artist, the eponymous Charlie Chan Hock Chye, and by weaving together fact and fiction, and different genres, tells the story of the formative years of Singapore's modern history and the history of comics.

Shortly before the book's release in Singapore, the National Arts Council withdrew its grant of $8,000 for the title, citing "sensitive content" and its potential to "undermine the authority and legitimacy" of the government. The comic became the best-selling local fiction title that year. The Art of Charlie Chan Hock Chye was published in the United States by Pantheon Books in 2016 and went on to make bestseller lists at Amazon and The New York Times, which was unprecedented for a Singaporean graphic novel. Besides winning the Singapore Literature Prize, it also won the Book of the Year accolade at the Singapore Book Awards in 2016. It was awarded the Pingprisen for Best International Comic in 2017. At the 2017 San Diego Comic-Con, Sonny Liew and The Art of Charlie Chan Hock Chye won three Eisner Awards—Best Writer/Artist, Best U.S. Edition of International Material - Asia, and Best Publication Design. It was also nominated for three other Eisner Awards—Best Letterer, Best Colorist, and Best Graphic Album - New.

List of selected works 

Godshaper #1 (2017, Boom! Studios)
Variant Cover Artist
Shadow Hero Comics #1 (2017, Panda Express)
Artist. With Gene Luen Yang (Writer).
Revolutionaries #1 (2017, IDW Publishing)
Variant Cover Artist
GI Joe Vol.8 #1 (2016, IDW Publishing)
Variant Cover Artist
Transformers Lost Light #1 (2016, IDW Publishing)
Variant Cover Artist
Optimus Prime #1 (2016, IDW Publishing)
Variant Cover Artist
M.A.S.K. Mobile Armored Strike Kommand #1 (2016, IDW Publishing)
Variant Cover Artist
Doctor Fate Vol 4 #1-12, #15-16 (2015-2016, DC Comics)
Artist. With Paul Levitz (Writer).
The Art of Charlie Chan Hock Chye (2015, Epigram Books; 2016 Pantheon Books)
Creator, writer, artist.
Jim Henson's Storyteller: Witches (2015, Archaia Entertainment)
Cover Artist
Americatown #1 (2015, Boom! Studios)
Variant Cover Artist
Hacktivist #1 (2015, Boom! Studios)
Variant Cover Artist
Abigail and the Snowman #1 (2014, Boom! Studios)
Variant Cover Artist
Warm Nights Deathless Days: The Life of Georgette Chen (2014, National Gallery Singapore)
Creator, writer, artist
The Shadow Hero (2014, First Second Books)
Artist. With Gene Luen Yang (Writer). 
Malinky Robot: Collected Stories & Other Bits (2011, Image Comics)
Artist, Writer
Vertigo Resurrected: My Faith in Frankie (2011, DC Vertigo)
Artist, Co-Creator. With Mike Carey (Writer), Marc Hempel (Inker).
Sense and Sensibility (2010, Marvel Comics)
Artist. With Nancy Butler (Writer).
Au Pays des Merveilles (2010, Bao)
Artist, Co-Creator. With Tommy Kovac (Writer).
Le Tour du monde en bande dessinée vol 2 (2009, Delcourt)
Artist, Writer
Pride and Prejudice (2009, Marvel Comics)
Cover Artist 
Marvel Adventures Spider-Man #50 (2009, Marvel Comics)
Artist. With Roger Landridge (Writer).
Wonderland (2009, Disney Press)
Artist, Co-Creator 
Malinky Robot (French Edition) (2009, Bao)
Artist, Writer
Liquid City (Vol. 1, 2, 3) (2008-2014, Image Comics)
Editor, Artist, Writer 
Wonderland (2006-7, Slave Labor Graphics/Disney Press)
Artist, Co-Creator . With Tommy Kovac (Writer).
Re-Gifters (2007, DC Minx)
Artist, Co-Creator. With Mike Carey (Writer), Marc Hempel (Inker).
Flight (Vol. 2, 5, 8) (2005–11, Image Comics/Villard)
Artist, Writer
Malinky Robot: Bicycle (2005, Slave Labor Graphics)
Artist, Writer 
My Faith in Frankie (2004, DC Vertigo)
Artist, Co-Creator. With Mike Carey (Writer), Marc Hempel (Inker).
Malinky Robot: Stinky Fish Blues (2002, Self-Published under Red Robot Productions)
Artist, Writer 
Marvel Universe Millennial Visions (2002, Marvel Comics)
Pin-up Artist
Frankie & Poo: What is love (Incomplete and abridged) (1996, Times Books International)
Artist, Writer

References

External links

Official site
Blog site
Flight official site
Slave Labor Graphics official site
Liquid City official site
Sonny Liew's interview on Kochipan(in French)

Comic strip cartoonists
Malaysian comics artists
Singaporean comics artists
1974 births
Living people
Eisner Award winners
Eisner Award winners for Best Writer/Artist
Eisner Award winners for Best Publication Design
Victoria School, Singapore alumni
Malaysian people of Chinese descent
Victoria Junior College alumni
Alumni of Clare College, Cambridge
Malaysian emigrants to Singapore